These are the official results of the Men's 3,000 metres Steeplechase event at the 1990 European Championships in Split, Yugoslavia, held at Stadion Poljud on 28 and 30 August 1990.

Medalists

Final

Heats

Participation
According to an unofficial count, 22 athletes from 13 countries participated in the event.

 (1)
 (2)
 (1)
 (2)
 (3)
 (2)
 (1)
 (2)
 (2)
 (1)
 (3)
 (1)
 (1)

See also
 1988 Men's Olympic 3,000m Steeplechase (Seoul)
 1991 Men's World Championships 3,000m Steeplechase (Tokyo)
 1992 Men's Olympic 3,000m Steeplechase (Barcelona)

References

 Results

Steeplechase 3000
Steeplechase at the European Athletics Championships